Kalaa Sghira is a town and commune in the Sousse Governorate, Tunisia. As of 2004 it had a population of 25,078.

Notable people 
 Mohamed Hedi El Amri (1906–1978) was a Tunisian historian and writer.

See also 
List of cities in Tunisia

References

External links 
 

Populated places in Tunisia
Communes of Tunisia
Tunisia geography articles needing translation from French Wikipedia